Lucius Theus (October 11, 1922 – October 15, 2007) was an American military officer and aviator. A Tuskegee Airman during World War II, he became the third black Major General in the United States Air Force.

Early life
Theus was born in Madison County, Tennessee. According to the Official DEOMI (Defense Equal Opportunity Management Institute) website, General Theus chaired the military task force that resulted in Defense Directive 1322.11 which in 1971 established the military's Race Relations Board and resulted in the founding of the DEOMI then known as the DRRI.

Military service
His tour of duty began in World War II as a private in the Army Air Corps. He retired as a Major General It included stops in Tuskegee, Germany, France, Greece, and Vietnam, and led him to command of the Air Force Accounting and Finance Center and an Assistant Directorship of the Defense Security Assistance Agency.

He spent much of his military career developing and implementing administrative systems to improve the life of the average airman and soldier. Programs such as direct deposit for military payrolls and better human relations are prime examples. While assigned to the Pentagon, he chaired the inter-service task force where his recommendations led to a Department of Defense-wide race relations education and policy development, and establishment of the forerunner to the Defense Equal Opportunity Management Institute. He retired from the Air Force in 1979.

Theus was the first African American support officer and the third overall to be appointed general in the U.S. Air Force. He was also the first African American to attend Harvard Business School's six-week Advanced Management Program.

Awards
 Congressional Gold Medal awarded to the Tuskegee Airmen in 2006

He is the recipient of the Distinguished Service Medal with an Oak Leaf Cluster
The Legion of Merit
The Bronze Star Medal.
Boy Scouts Silver Beaver Award
He was inducted into the Enlisted Men's Hall of Fame in 1995. 
The Major General Lucius Theus Auditorium at Patrick Air Force Base was dedicated in his honor in 1996.
Michigan Aviation Hall of Fame on October 19, 1996.
Honorary Business degree Madonna University

Education
Theus graduated with a bachelor of science degree from the University of Maryland in 1956 and a master's degree in business administration from The George Washington University in 1957.

See also
 Dogfights (TV series)
 Executive Order 9981
 List of Tuskegee Airmen
 Military history of African Americans
 The Tuskegee Airmen (movie)

References

External links
 Fly (2009 play about the 332d Fighter Group)
 Tuskegee Airmen at Tuskegee University
 Tuskegee Airmen Archives at the University of California, Riverside Libraries.
 Tuskegee Airmen, Inc.
 Tuskegee Airmen National Historic Site (U.S. National Park Service) 
 Tuskegee Airmen National Museum

1922 births
2007 deaths
United States Air Force generals
United States Army Air Forces officers
Recipients of the Legion of Merit
University System of Maryland alumni
George Washington University School of Business alumni
Burials at Arlington National Cemetery
United States Army Air Forces personnel of World War II